is a Japanese master of Shotokan karate.
He has won the JKA's version of the world championships for kata on 2 occasions. He has also won the JKA All-Japan championships for kata on 5 occasions.
He is currently an instructor of the Japan Karate Association.

Biography

Takenori Imura was born in Shizuoka Prefecture, Japan on 14 July 1952. He studied at Japan University. His karate training began during his 1st year of university.

Competition
Takenori Imura has had considerable success in karate competition.

Major Tournament Success
6th Shoto World Cup Karate Championship Tournament (Osaka, 1996) - 1st Place Group Kata
39th JKA All Japan Karate Championship (1996) - 1st Place Kata
38th JKA All Japan Karate Championship (1995) - 1st Place Kata
5th Shoto World Cup Karate Championship Tournament  (Philadelphia, 1994) - 1st Place Kata
37th JKA All Japan Karate Championship (1994) - 1st Place Kata
36th JKA All Japan Karate Championship (1993) - 1st Place Kata
4th Shoto World Cup Karate Championship Tournament (Tokyo, 1992) - 2nd Place Kata
35th JKA All Japan Karate Championship (1992) - 1st Place Kata
34th JKA All Japan Karate Championship (1991) - 2nd Place Kata
33rd JKA All Japan Karate Championship (1990) - 3rd Place Kata
31st JKA All Japan Karate Championship (1988) - 2nd Place Kata
2nd Shoto World Cup Karate Championship Tournament  - 1st Place Kata/Group Kata
29th JKA All Japan Karate Championship (1986) - 2nd Place Kata
24th JKA All Japan Karate Championship (1981) - 3rd Place Kata
23rd JKA All Japan Karate Championship (1980) - 3rd Place Kumite

References

 

1952 births
Japanese male karateka
Karate coaches
Shotokan practitioners
Sportspeople from Shizuoka Prefecture
Living people